Silas Zehnder (born 30 June 1999) is a German professional footballer who plays as a forward for Viktoria Aschaffenburg.

References

External links
 

1999 births
Living people
German footballers
Association football forwards
SV Darmstadt 98 players
Viktoria Aschaffenburg players
Bundesliga players
Regionalliga players